A Man's Shadow is a 1920 British silent crime film directed by Sidney Morgan and starring Langhorn Burton, Violet Graham and Gladys Mason. In the film, a man murders a Jewish moneylender, but his doppelganger is accused of the crime.

Cast
 Langhorn Burton as Peter Beresford / Julian Grey  
 Violet Graham as Vivian Beresford  
 Gladys Mason as Yolande Hampton 
 Arthur Lennard as Robert Hampden  
 J. Denton-Thompson as Williams  
 Sidney Paxton as Billings 
 Babs Ronald as Helen Beresford  
 Warris Linden as Simon Oppenheim

References

Bibliography
 Low, Rachael. The History of the British Film 1918-1929. George Allen & Unwin, 1971.

External links
 

1920 films
British crime films
British silent feature films
Films directed by Sidney Morgan
1920 crime films
Films set in London
British black-and-white films
1920s English-language films
1920s British films